Sir Henry Edward Agincourt Hodges (October 1844 – 8 August 1919) was senior puisne judge of the Supreme Court of Victoria, Australia.

Biography
Hodges was born in Liverpool, England, the son of Henry and Mary Hodges. They left for Australia when he was around ten years of age.
He was educated at either Melbourne Grammar School or Church of England Grammar School and Melbourne University, where he was one of the first enrolled at Trinity College. and graduated BA in 1875.

He was for some time tutor to the families of, successively, Premier James Francis and Chief Justice William Stawell.

Hodges was admitted to the bar and for several years had an extensive practice.

In 1889 Hodges was appointed puisne judge to the Supreme Court Bench.

He was knighted in June 1918.

Hodges was knighted in 1938. With the exception of Sir Thomas à Beckett, he was longer on the bench than any other judge.

He died at "Dreamthorpe", a magnificent summer residence on the slopes of Mount Macedon that he established.

His remains were interred at the Boroondara cemetery.

For some time there had been only four judges on the Victorian Supreme Court: (Sir William Irvine (chief judge), Hodges, Hood, and Cussen), when the law provided for six, and in 1919 two additional judges were appointed, W. J. Schutt and F. W. Mann. They took their seats shortly after Hodges' death.

Other interests
Hodges was an active Anglican churchgoer and for many years chancellor of the Diocese of Melbourne.
He was first president of the Old Melburnians' Society. 
While on holiday in London in 1901 he represented Australia at a conference called to establish an Imperial Court of Final Appeal.

Family
Hodges married Margaret Knox ( – ) in 1878. She was a daughter of Melbourne solicitor George Knox and sister of William Knox MHR. Their children included:
younger son Capt. E. Norman Hodges MC, a barrister, died July 1918 of pneumonia while on active service during the Great War.
Margaret Hodges (died 1932) married Air Commodore John David Boyle, son of the Earl of Glasgow, on 9 December 1913
Dr. Georges C. "Girlie" Hodges, of Collins Street, was first woman to qualify Master of Surgery in Victoria.
Mary Eirene Hodges (1879–1951) married Lieut. (Howard) Clifton Brown on 14 July 1903.
On 4 December 1909 he married again, to Alice Belinda Chirnside (died 23 November 1942), widow of Robert Chirnside of Carranballac Station, near Skipton.

References

External links 

 Sir Henry Edward Hodges (1844–1919), Australian Dictionary of Biography entry

1844 births
1919 deaths
Judges of the Supreme Court of Victoria